Prasanta Behera is a Politician from Odisha in India. He is serving as M.L.A. of Salipur since 2019.

Early life
Prasanta Behera was born in 1977 in a Gopal (Yadav) family. His father Dharmananda Behera is a veteran Politician and former M.L.A. of Choudwar-Cuttack Vidhan sabha constituency. He did his schooling at Kamalakanta Vidyapitha, Cuttack and bachelor's degree in Science at Choudwar College, Choudwar.

Political career
In 2014 Vidhan sabha elections Prasanta Behera contested as a candidate of Biju Janata Dala for Salipur constituency, but lost to INC's candidate Prakash Chandra Behera by a margin of 2117 votes.

In 2019 Vidhan sabha elections Prasanta successfully won by defeating BJP's Prakash Chandra Behera.

References

Living people
People from Cuttack
Odisha politicians
Biju Janata Dal politicians
Odisha MLAs 2019–2024
1977 births